Derrick Spencer (born 10 May 1982 in Durban, KwaZulu-Natal) is a South African football (soccer) player who plays as a defender or midfielder for Bidvest Wits in the Premier Soccer League.

Through his foundation, Spencer established an annual football festival for local KwaZulu school teams.

References

External links
Player's profile at absapremiership.co.za

1982 births
South African soccer players
Living people
Sportspeople from Durban
Association football midfielders
Association football defenders
Kaizer Chiefs F.C. players
Mamelodi Sundowns F.C. players
Hellenic F.C. players
Cape Coloureds
Platinum Stars F.C. players
Bidvest Wits F.C. players